Bruce Jerry Scott (born April 7, 1933) is an American former politician in the state of Florida.

Scott was born in Marco Island, Florida and lived in North Fort Myers, Florida. He was a realtor and developer. He served in the Florida House of Representatives from 1961 to 1963, as a Democrat, representing Lee County.

References

Living people
1933 births
Democratic Party members of the Florida House of Representatives
People from Marco Island, Florida
People from North Fort Myers, Florida